Whoops, I'm an Indian! is a 1936 short subject directed by Del Lord starring American slapstick comedy team The Three Stooges (Moe Howard, Larry Fine and Curly Howard). It is the 18th entry in the series released by Columbia Pictures starring the comedians, who released 190 shorts for the studio between 1934 and 1959.

Plot
The Stooges are crooked gamblers in the Old Western town of Lobo City. Eventually, they are caught cheating the residents of a frontier town, including an evil, tough, muscular woodcutter named Pierre (Bud Jamison) when Larry hid a horseshoe magnet inside his shoe. They are discovered and must escape into the wilderness. Now as fugitives, the Stooges have to elude the sheriff; they hunt, fish, and disguise themselves as Indians.

Things start to go wrong when Pierre takes a liking to Curly, who is disguised as an Indian woman. The two soon get married, then eventually Curly's wig accidentally slips off and the trio has to make another run for it. They soon find what they believe to be a safe place to hide, only to discover that they have accidentally locked themselves in the Lobo City Jail.

Production notes
Whoops, I'm an Indian! was filmed on June 2–6, 1936. The high-speed canoe footage was reused for the closing of 1937's Back to the Woods.

References

External links
 
 
Whoops, I'm an Indian! at threestooges.net

1936 films
The Three Stooges films
American black-and-white films
Films directed by Del Lord
Columbia Pictures short films
1930s Western (genre) comedy films
American Western (genre) comedy films
Films about Native Americans
American slapstick comedy films
1936 comedy films
1930s English-language films
1930s American films
American crime comedy films
American crime films